The Oracle Application Server 10g (the "g" stands for grid) (short Oracle AS), consists of an integrated, standards-based software platform. It forms part of Oracle Corporation's Fusion Middleware technology stack. The heart of Oracle Application Server consists of Oracle HTTP Server (based on Apache HTTP Server) and OC4J (OracleAS Containers for Java EE) which deploys Java EE-based applications. The  version of OC4J offers full compatibility with the Java EE 1.4 specifications.

Oracle Application Server became the first platform designed for grid computing as well as with full life-cycle support for service-oriented architecture (SOA).

The  release of Oracle Application Server, 10g R3, does not feature a metadata repository tier, relying instead on metadata repositories provided in previous releases.

Following Oracle's acquisition of BEA Systems: “key features [will be] integrated with WebLogic Server with seamless migration”.

History 
Oracle Corporation marketed its first application server using the name Oracle Web Server (OWS).
A subsequent repackaging resulted in the Oracle Application Server (OAS).
A later product, superseding OAS, became the iAS (Internet Application Server).

Editions
Oracle Corporation subdivides some of its products into varying "editions"—apparently to facilitate marketing and license-tracking.

Available Oracle AS editions include:
 Enterprise Edition 
 Standard Edition
 Standard Edition One
 Java Edition

Components
 Oracle Portal
 Oracle Identity Management
 Oracle Integration
 Oracle Business Rules
 Oracle BPEL Process Manager (option)
 Oracle Business Activity Monitoring (option)
 Oracle Business Intelligence
 Oracle Forms
 Oracle Reports
 Oracle TopLink
 Oracle JDeveloper
 Oracle Application Server Containers for Java EE (OC4J)
 Oracle Enterprise Manager
 Oracle Application Server Web Cache
 Oracle Application Server Wireless
 Oracle Application Development Framework

OC4J
Oracle Corporation refers to its implementation of the Java EE specification as Oracle Containers for J2EE and abbreviates the concept as OC4J.  OC4J, originally based on the IronFlare Orion Application Server, has developed solely under Oracle's control since Oracle Corporation acquired the source code.

OC4J includes the following servers:
 Web Container
 Enterprise JavaBean Container
 JMS Server

Implementation 

Oracle Application Server can utilize an "Oracle AS Infrastructure Database"—an Oracle database instance supporting the Oracle AS Metadata Repository and/or Oracle Identity Management.

OPMN - the Oracle Process Management and Notification server - monitors components of the Oracle Application Server.

Operation 

The  command starts, stops and monitors Oracle AS components.

See also
 Comparison of application servers
 HATEOAS (Hypermedia as the Engine of Application State)

Footnotes

External links
 Oracle Application Server
 OC4J site
 Differences between Standard Edition One, Standard Edition, Enterprise Edition

Oracle software
Java enterprise platform
Web server software